The Chief Justice of the Russian Federation, officially the Chairman of the Supreme Court is the chief judge of the Supreme Court of Russia and the highest-ranking officer of the Russian federal judiciary.

The Constitution grants plenary power to the president of Russia to nominate, and with the advice and consent of the Russian Federation Council, appoint a chief justice, who serves until they resign, retire, are impeached and convicted, or die.

Current chief justice is Vyacheslav Lebedev.

List

Chiefs Justice of Soviet Russia

Chief Justice of the Russian Federation 

Lebedev was approved by the Federation Council on 2 July 1999, 21 February 2007, 18 July 2012, 21 May 2014 (after disestablishment of the Supreme Court of Arbitration) and 25 September 2019.

See also 
 Supreme Court of the Soviet Union

References

External links 

 
 Chief justice of Soviet Russia

 
1923 establishments in Russia
Lists of office-holders in Russia
Lists of legal professionals